Vigodarzere is a comune (municipality) in the Province of Padua in the Italian region Veneto, located about  west of Venice and about  northeast of Padua.

Vigodarzere borders the following municipalities: Cadoneghe, Campodarsego, Curtarolo, Limena, Padua, San Giorgio delle Pertiche.

References

Cities and towns in Veneto